Alexander George Gibson  (21 September 1875 – 11 January 1950) was a British physician, pathologist, and cardiologist.

Biography
Alexander Gibson graduated in 1895 from University College, Aberystwyth with a BSc, and then in 1900 from Christ Church, Oxford with a first-class BA honours degree in Natural Sciences. After completing his medical training at St Thomas’ Hospital, he took his BM in 1904. After briefly holding a house appointment at St Thomas' Hospital, in 1904 he became a house physician at the Radcliffe Infirmary in Oxford; in 1911 he became an assistant pathologist. He qualified MRCP in 1905 and graduated DM (Oxon.) in 1908. He was elected FRCP in 1913.

During the First World War Gibson served as a Major in the 3rd Southern General Hospital in Oxford, and upon demobilisation in 1919 was appointed a full physician at the Radcliffe Infirmary. At the University of Oxford he was successively appointed Demonstrator of Pathology, Lecturer on Morbid Anatomy, and Reader (latterly Nuffield Reader) in Morbid Anatomy.

Gibson chaired the meeting which formed the Cardiac Club on 22 April 1922. The Cardiac Club became in 1937 the Cardiac Society of Great Britain and Ireland, and is now known as the British Cardiovascular Society.

In 1921 at the London Hospital Medical College, Gibson delivered the Schorstein Lecture. Under the auspices of the Royal College of Physicians, he gave in 1928 the Bradshaw Lecture on pyelitis and pyelonephritis.

 For the Quarterly Journal of Medicine he was one of the editors from 1929 to 1937 and served as the secretary for the editorial board from 1907 to 1937. He was the co-author with William Tregonwell Collier (1889–1932) of Methods of Clinical Diagnosis (1927).

In 1937 Gibson was made a Fellow of Merton College, Oxford, a position he held until 1942.

Gibson married Constance Muriel Jones. They had two sons and a daughter.

References 

1875 births
1950 deaths
Alumni of Aberystwyth University
Alumni of Christ Church, Oxford
20th-century English medical doctors
British cardiologists
British pathologists
Fellows of the Royal College of Physicians
Royal Army Medical Corps officers
Fellows of Merton College, Oxford